Anne Benson Fisher (February 1, 1898 – March 5, 1967) was an American writer of fiction and non-fiction whose primary emphasis was California. Her two most significant works were her novel Cathedral in the Sun (1940) and her contribution to the Rivers of America Series, The Salinas: Upside Down River (1945).

In 1922 Fisher married Walter Kenrick Fisher. They resided in Pacific Grove, California, and also had a house in Carmel Valley. Fisher moved to Medford, Oregon after her husband's death. Her novel Cathedral in the Sun was based on the lives of the early settlers of the Carmel Valley, James Meadows and Loretta Onesimo de Peralta, who were married in 1842.

Cathedral in the Sun led to an invitation by Stephen Vincent Benét to write about the Salinas River for the Rivers of America Series

Non-fiction
  Wide Road ahead: the story of a woman bacteriologist E. P. Dutton, [New York], 1939
Bears, Pirates and Silver Lace - Stories of Old California, Binfords & Mort, Portland, Oregon, 1944, 134 pp. Illustrated by Phil Nesbitt
  The Salinas: Upside Down River, Farrar and Rinehart, New York City, 1945
No More a Stranger: A Tale of Robert Louis Stevenson, Stanford University Press, Stanford University, California, 1946, 265 pp.
  Stories California Indians Told, Parnassus Press, Berkeley, California, 1957, 110 pp, Illustrated By Ruth Robbins

Fiction
 Cathedral in the Sun, Carlyle House, New York, 1940, 408pp.
 It's a Wise Child: A Disorderly Comedy of Fatherhood, Bobbs-Merrill, Indianapolis, 1949, 281 pp.
  Oh Glittering Promise! A Novel of the California Gold Rush, Bobbs-Merrill, Indianapolis, 1949, 294 pp

References

External links
 Papers of Anne B Fisher
 Memorial to Walter Kenrick Fisher
 Fisher Papers at the Library of Congress
 Carmel Valley Past

1898 births
1967 deaths
20th-century American women writers
People from Pacific Grove, California
American women novelists
American women non-fiction writers
20th-century American novelists
20th-century American non-fiction writers
Novelists from California